Allium tenuiflorum is a Mediterranean species of wild onion found in Algeria, Morocco, Libya, Italy including Sardinia, and the Balkans.

Allium tenuiflorum produces a bulb up to 20 mm long. Scape is up to 40 cm tall. Umbel is lax with uneven pedicels. Flowers are bell-shaped, tepals white with green or purple midveins and white anthers. Ovary at flowering time yellow-green.

References

tenuiflorum
Onions
Plants described in 1811